The men's 200m breaststroke swimming event at the 2006 Asian Games was held on December 7, 2006 at the Hamad Aquatic Centre in Doha, Qatar.

Schedule
All times are Arabia Standard Time (UTC+03:00)

Records

Results
Legend
DNS — Did not start

Heats

Final

References

Results

Swimming at the 2006 Asian Games